Irupana Municipality or Villa de Lanza Municipality is the second municipal section of the Sud Yungas Province in the La Paz Department, Bolivia. Its seat is Irupana.

Geography 
The Cordillera Real traverses the municipality. Other mountains are listed below:

Subdivision  
Irupana Municipality is divided into six cantons.

See also 
 Laram Quta

References

External links 
 Irupana Municipality: Population data and map

Municipalities of La Paz Department (Bolivia)